Taza (also Tazi; Tazhe; Tah-ze; Tahzi; Tahzay; Tazhay) (c. 1843 – 26 September 1876) was the son of Cochise, leader of the Chihuicahui local group of the Chokonen and principal chief of the Chokonen band of the Chiricahua Apache. His mother Dos-teh-seh (“Something-at-the-campfire-already-cooked”), was the daughter of Mangas Coloradas, leader of the Copper Mines and last leader of the Mimbreños local groups of the Chihenne band and principal chief of the Chihenne band of the Chiricahua Apache.

Chief Taza
Taza was the older full brother of Naiche (Natchez). Taza succeeded his father Cochise as chief of the Chiricahuas when the latter died in 1874, two years after the Chiricahua Reservation was established by General Howard. In 1876 the tribe was removed from the Chiricahua reservation to San Carlos, and in September of the same year Taza was one of a delegation of Apaches taken to Washington D.C. for a visit. He fell ill in Washington and died there of pneumonia on September 26, 1876, after only about two years as chief.

Taza is buried in Congressional Cemetery in Washington D.C. Taza's mother Dos-teh-seh, his brother Naiche, and his half-sisters Dash-den-zhoos and Naithlotonz (Naiche-dos), lived through the prisoner-of-war period and went to Mescalero.

It is unknown if a portrait of Taza was ever made; an alleged "photograph" of Taza was actually made of a Native American named George Noche in 1886.

Legacy
The 1954 film Taza, Son of Cochise was directed by Douglas Sirk and stars Rock Hudson as Taza.

References

External links
 

1840s births
1876 deaths
Burials at the Congressional Cemetery
Chiricahua people
Native American leaders
Deaths from pneumonia in Washington, D.C.
Year of birth uncertain